KLZR (91.7 FM) is a radio station licensed to serve the community of Westcliffe, Colorado. The station is owned by Wet Mountain Broadcasting Corp. It airs a variety format and is staffed primarily by volunteers from the surrounding Wet Mountain Valley community.

According to its website, the station began in 2004 as KWMV-LP, a low power FM broadcasting at 95.9. In September 2015, KLZR went on the air at 91.7 as a full-power station, replacing KWMV.

References

External links
 Official Website
 

LZR (FM)
Radio stations established in 2012
2012 establishments in Colorado
Variety radio stations in the United States
Community radio stations in the United States
Custer County, Colorado